Long Buckby railway station is a small railway station next to the village of Long Buckby, Northamptonshire, England.

The station is on the Northampton loop of the West Coast Main Line.

History

The station was opened along with the line on 1 December 1881, by the London and North Western Railway, it is the only remaining station between Northampton and Rugby; three others opened on the same stretch of line (and ) are now closed.

The original station buildings were demolished during the period of British Rail, and replaced with more basic facilities.  

Since the closure of Althorp Park station in 1960, Long Buckby has been the nearest station to Althorp, the family home of the Earls Spencer. In September 1997 Long Buckby station was seen on television across the world, as it was where Charles, Prince of Wales, Prince William and Prince Harry arrived from London after the Funeral of Diana, Princess of Wales.

Services

Facilities
The station platforms are above street level on an embankment, and are accessed by stairs, there are basic shelters on each platform. A cabin next to the station car park serves as a part-time ticket office, there is also a ticket machine.

Service summary

References

External links

Old photograph of the station from 1952 - flickr.com

Railway stations in Northamptonshire
DfT Category E stations
Former London and North Western Railway stations
Railway stations in Great Britain opened in 1881
Railway stations served by West Midlands Trains
1881 establishments in England
Stations on the West Coast Main Line